Ashoka University is a private university located in the National Capital Region (NCR), India, focusing on liberal education in Humanities, Social Sciences, and Sciences.

History

Ashoka University derives its name from Emperor Ashoka of India. The idea was generated when Sanjeev Bikhchandani and Ashish Dhawan  approached the former Indian School of Business dean Pramath Raj Sinha for his help in setting up the university. The project was code-named Project Nobel, referring to the founders' aspiration to produce future Nobel Prize laureates.

Initial discussions leaned towards setting up an institute of engineering and technology that could match the reputation of leading institutions in the field such as MIT, the University of Pennsylvania and Stanford University. Ashoka's founders signed a memorandum of understanding with the University of Pennsylvania School of Engineering and Applied Science. The founders' list named 22 people, including Ashok Trivedi, Dilip Shanghvi, Nirmal Jain, Sanjeev Bikhchandani and Jerry Rao. The list later grew to 46 and today it stands at 160 founders.

Ashoka expanded its focus to a liberal arts approach, providing instruction in the core sciences, social sciences, and the humanities. The decision was a result of both the industry demand as well as the desire to change the mindset of Indian students and parents. Trivedi fortified this decision by setting up the Trivedi Centre for Political Data (TCPD) in partnership with the University of Michigan. In 2020, Ashoka University established the Trivedi School of Biosciences with virologist Shahid Jameel as the first director of the centre.

Campus

Ashoka University's  main campus is in the Rajiv Gandhi Education City in Sonepat, Haryana. It was designed by the American design firm Perkins Eastman led by architect Aaron Schwarz. In September 2021, the foundation stone was laid for a new 27-acre campus in Sonipat, expected to be operational by 2027, which will double the university's student capacity.

Governance
Ashoka University is funded entirely by donations, with no hierarchies present in the founding group in terms of decision-making. The founders were drawn to the idea of a university where no single individual held sway but whose administration would be driven by the potential for social change based on critical inquiry, free from political pressure. In addition to the chancellor, vice-chancellor and deans, Ashoka is guided by an academic council of academics and scholars. The council sets the university's academic standard, advising on matters of curriculum, faculty hiring, and research.

The first chancellor was Andre Beteille, who served from 2014. The first vice-chancellor was Rudrangshu Mukherjee. In 2017 Beteille resigned, to be replaced by Mukherjee, and Pratap Bhanu Mehta was appointed vice-chancellor from July 2017. Mehta resigned in July 2019 and was replaced by Malabika Sarkar. Sarkar stepped down on 1 January 2023 and was replaced by Somak Raychaudhury.

Academics

Undergraduate programme
The admission procedure includes an application form, an on-spot essay, an interview, and an aptitude objective test. During the admission of students into Ashoka's UG programme, students are not required to declare their major and may experiment with their course preferences. Only after the third semester does the school require students to declare a major.

Young India Fellowship
The Young India Fellowship (YIF), offered as a Postgraduate Diploma in Liberal Studies, is the signature programme at Ashoka University. The cohort now consists of 100 Fellows who come from diverse academic, professional, socio-economic, and geographical backgrounds. Within a year, they engage with diverse study, research and practice areas. Since 2011, the YIF has had over 1700 participants. Its first graduating class included 57 Fellows, all of whom were provided with a full scholarship. The programme comprises eight terms of six weeks each, with up to four courses in each term. The Fellowship emphasizes writing, research, and experiential learning—in the form of an 8-month part-time Experiential Learning Module. The application for the fellowship has an age restriction and it only allows students with maximum 28 years of age to apply for the program.

Masters programmes
Ashoka University offers graduate programmes in the form of master's degree and Ph.D. programmes. Right now the master's degree programmes are offered in Economics, English, and Liberal Studies as well as Ashoka Scholars Programme. While a Ph.D. degree is offered in Biology; Chemistry, Computer Sciences; Economics; English; History; Physics; Psychology; Sociology and Anthropology. Other short term programmes offered are the Young Scholars Programme, Summer Programmes and Ashoka X (Ashoka's virtual education initiative).

Ph.D programme
Ashoka University promotes interdisciplinary research and partnerships with industry and policy-makers. Students can register for Ph.D. programmes in Biology, Chemistry, Computer Science, Economics, English, History, Physics, Psychology, Sociology and Anthropology.

Chief Minister's Good Governance Associates (CMGGA) programme 
The CMGGA programme is a collaboration between the Government of Haryana and Ashoka University. The associates are trained, after which they are posted in each of the 22 districts of Haryana for 12 months. During their tenure, they represent the Chief Minister's Office and work closely with the Deputy Commissioner and district officials to drive changes at the highest and grassroots levels of the Government.

Admissions
Ashoka University's own admissions test is called the Ashoka Aptitude Test. It accepts the SAT from domestic applicants, one of the first universities in India to do so.  Ashoka University is a Founding Member institution of the India Global Higher Education Alliance, which addresses how admissions policies among Indian and non-Indian institutions influence access and equity in higher education.

Reputation

Ashoka University is known for scholarship in the international community. In 2017, the university was awarded 'University of the Year' (in existence for less than 10 years) and recognised for 'Excellence in Internationalization,' at the 4th Federation of Indian Chambers of Commerce and Industry (FICCI) Higher Education Excellence Awards 2017. 
In 2019, EducationWorld ranked Ashoka University 2nd in top 100 private universities in India. In September 2020, the Department of Economics was ranked number 1 in India out of 239 Institutions (and 31st in Asia out of 1539 institutions) according to Research Papers in Economics (RePEc) - the international database of economics research which covers 8198 institutions and 60355 registered authors worldwide. Further in 2020, the World Digital Awards 2020 was awarded to Ashoka for Organisational Excellence in Education. The university was also among 12 universities to get E-Learning Excellence for Academic Digitisation (E-LEAD) certification from QS IAUGE. In the same year, the Economics Department of the university ranked at number 1 (#1 of 239 institutions) in India, and in the top 12.5% in Asia (at #31 of 1539 institutions), according to the international database RePEc, which covers 8198 institutions and 60355 registered authors worldwide. In the QS World University Rankings 2022, Ashoka was ranked in the Top 30 universities in India and the Top 250 universities in Asia.

Centres at Ashoka

Ashoka University has established several centres to encourage research-oriented collaborations and create an exciting interdisciplinary environment at the university.
 Ashoka Centre for Translation
The Ashoka Centre for Translation (ACT) functions under professors Rita Kothari and Arunava Sinha. The vision of the centre is to foster, nurture, and foreground India's multilingual ethos. The Ashoka Centre for Translation aims to engage in knowledge production and distribution through the vehicle of translation. The Ashoka Centre for Translation does not restrict itself to only English.  
 Ashoka Centre for Well-Being
Ashoka Centre for Well-Being (ACWB) was established in 2016 as a one-of-a-kind, non-aligned entity. It provides a safe space where students, staff, as well as faculty members of the university can access free and confidential counselling and psychological support. The Centre consists of professionally qualified queer affirmative counsellors, ushered by Arvinder J Singh, Founder-Director of the centre. The centre also aims to encourage good mental health by devising effective coping mechanisms through skill-building and awareness programmes so that individuals are well-equipped to deal with any turmoil that they face. 
 Centre for China Studies
The Ashoka Centre for China Studies (ACCS) has been created with the vision of establishing China Studies as an interdisciplinary and multidisciplinary area studies program with a strong commitment to disciplinary depth and language learning. It is spearheaded by Ambassador Shivshankar Menon while Professor Srinath Raghavan serves as the Faculty Advisor. One of the primary aims of the centre is to promote the growth of China studies and research in reputed Indian institutions. This is done through an in-depth course design, and programs such as the China India Visiting Scholars Fellowship, China Studies Postdoctoral Fellowship, Mandarin Language Scholars Program, and Mandarin Language Teaching Program. 
 Centre for Climate Change and Sustainability
Established in 2020 as the brainchild of the Vice Chancellor Professor Malabika Sarkar,  the Centre for Climate Change and Sustainability (3CS) is an interdisciplinary centre that brings together members with a shared interest in studying, communicating, and mitigating the effects of future climate change on our society, health, and environment. The Centre leverages the expertise of 28 faculty members from across 9 departments, including Gautam Menon, Iain Stewart, Srinath Raghvan, Sumana Roy, L.S. Shashidhara among many other notable names. It aims to spread awareness, foster research and advocacy on pertinent issues of climate change and sustainability.

One of the key programs of the centre is the 3CS Media Fellowship. It has been designed to support climate journalism from marginalized members of the society, geographically or otherwise, who are most affected by climate change.  
 Centre for Economic Data and Analysis
The Centre for Economic Data and Analysis (CEDA) at Ashoka University is established by the Economics Department with Ashwini Deshpande serving as its Director. CEDA works to facilitate informed debate about economic and social developments in India. The centre also generates content in the form of blogs, research papers, policy briefs, and social and economic commentaries among other things. One of the primary aims of CEDA is to make data accessible to the concerned stakeholders. For this purpose, CEDA has created a public data repository along with an interactive visualization toolkit. This is extensively used by researchers, journalists, policymakers, students, and others.
 Centre for Entrepreneurship
Ashoka University has always been proactive in encouraging its entrepreneurial minds. To this end, the InfoEdge Centre for Entrepreneurship with support from the founders and under Priyank Narayan functions as the creative hub that nurtures entrepreneurial endeavors. It has a set of experts who provide relevant mentorship. The center is multidisciplinary in its approach, existing at the cusp of Liberal Arts and Entrepreneurship, the result of which is a community of Entrepreneurs working in a wide range of sectors spanning from the mainstream to the niche sectors. It holds events like Startup Ashoka, Ashoka Pillar Award, AIM Smart City Accelerator among others. 
 Centre for Interdisciplinary Archaeological Research
The Centre for Interdisciplinary Archaeological Research (CIAR) at Ashoka University, is the first of its kind in India. The faculty membership is spread across departments with names such as Nayanjot Lahiri, Kritika M. Garg, Shibani Bose, Alok Bhattacharya and Upinder Singh. The Centre aims to bridge the gap between the sciences and archaeology and use that interdisciplinarity to facilitate novel opinions that will deepen the study of the Indian past. This would also aid the Centre in designing course pedagogy and initiate research that utilizes perspectives from both sciences and humanities. To achieve this, the centre has also launched fellowships in ancient and medieval Indian history/archaeology. 
 Centre for Social and Behaviour Change
Founded by Ashoka University and supported by the Bill and Melinda Gates Foundation (BMGF), the Centre for Social and Behavior Change (CSBC) drives behavioral change measures for people and communities in need. The center is led by Dr Pavan Mamidi and Dr Sharon Barnhardt. It aims to advance the science and practice of behavior changes, harnessing cross-disciplinary expertise in the areas of nutrition, sanitation, maternal health, family planning, and financial services. In 2019, the NITI Aayog partnered with  CSBC and BMGF to institute an embedded Behavioral Insights Unit for India and introduce a novel paradigm of behaviorally-informed policy design and implementation in the country. Since then, CSBC has partnered with the state governments of Uttar Pradesh and Bihar to set up Behavioral Insights Units in UP and Bihar.
 Centre for Social Impact and Philanthropy
The Centre for Social Impact and Philanthropy (CSIP) was instituted in 2016, through the efforts of Ingrid Srinath, who serves as the center's Director. It is the country's first academic center that aims to drive increased social impact through a strategic and robust model of philanthropy. Through its research and knowledge products, convening and facilitation opportunities, and leadership development programs, CSIP is cultivating a stronger civil society for a vibrant and equitable India. The Mother Teresa Fellowship, inaugurated in 2012, is now an integral part of the center. It is a values-based early career fellowship for Ashoka University graduates who want to develop their footing in the field of social impact.
 Centre for Studies in Gender and Sexuality
Established in the formative years of Ashoka University in 2015, the Centre for Studies in Gender and Sexuality (CSGS) is one of the Centres of Excellence and is the first of its kind in India. With Professor Madhavi Menon as its director, the primary aim of the centre is to broaden the discourse that currently exists around gender and sexuality, through scholarship and activism. This spectrum includes issues of inequality, fantasy, desire, pleasure, identity, and politics that are key realities of our everyday lives. The Centre organizes several events such as a speaker series, student seminars, workshops, performances, and film screenings to initiate discussions around topics that are considered taboo.
 Centre for Writing and Communication
The Centre for Writing and Communication (CWC) is the largest centre at Ashoka University working closely with the vibrant academic community to develop critical thinking, writing, and communication skills. Kanika Singh is the Director of the centre with Jyotirmoy Talukdar as Senior Writing Fellow (English Language Teaching), Neerav Dwivedi as Senior Writing Fellow and Senjuti Chakraborti, Archishman Sarker and Vrinda Chopra as Senior Writing Tutors, Ipsita Herlekar, Sonakshi Srivastava, Vinky Mittal, Sampurna Dutta among others as Writing Tutors. It works with not only the entire student body but also with the faculty, staff, and other centres. The Centre itself is very academically diverse with a spirited team consisting of scholars, professionals, writers, and researchers whose combined expertise actively contributes to the interdisciplinary engagement at Ashoka University.

 The Centre for the Creative and the Critical

The Centre’s purpose is to provide a forum in which to raise and address questions to do with both creative practice and critical argument. In bringing together novelists, poets, translators, artists, scholars, filmmakers, journalists and publishers with different traditions and histories from all over the world, the Centre will foster intercultural and ‘extra-disciplinary’ discussions about creative practice in ways that have become impossible in professionalised settings, such as the academic conference, or in market-driven ones, such as the literary festival. The highly-regarded symposia in the 'literary activism' series and the website, literaryactivism.com, will continue to be an important part of the Centre’s activities. So will new courses, talks, and events, including 'Is There a Modern Indian Literature?', co-hosted by The Oxford Research Centre for the Humanities. The Director of the Centre is Amit Chaudhuri, and its team includes Saikat Majumdar and Sumana Roy.
 Science Policy Initiative
Established in 2019, the Science Policy Initiative (SPI) at Ashoka University aims to expedite the framing of evidence-based policies to address societal problems. Under the guidance of L.S. Shashidhara and Anjali Taneja, the centre is involved in creating the right environment for policy research and capability building through active support and expert leadership. One of the larger goals of SPI is to augment scientific research and innovation and to serve as a knowledge hub, initiating discussions on issues and defining the roadmap for the future with the help of evidence-based white papers and policy briefs along with partnerships and collaborations. 
 Trivedi Centre for Political Data
The Trivedi Centre for Political Data (TCPD) is a joint venture between the departments of Political Science and Computer Science at Ashoka University, with professors Gilles Verniers and Sudheendra Hangal serving as its co-directors. TCPD aims at promoting data-driven research, policy work, and journalism on India's political life by producing and disseminating in open access scientifically collected and treated political data and also refining the quality of existing public data by developing web-based tools adapted to Indian data. The larger goal of TCPD is to become a reference source of political data and contribute to more empirical research, news coverage, and opinions about Indian politics.

Institutional Collaborations

Ashoka University has a number of international institutional collaborations with global university partners including UPenn, UMIchigan, Yale, Duke, King's College London, HEC Paris, SciencesPo Paris and many others. Faculty exchange, student exchange, and plans for collaborative programmes with international partners are a recognition of Ashoka's position.

The university has accelerated its growth story and has signed MoUs with leading institutions around the globe. The University of Cambridge and Ashoka University have signed a Memorandum of Understanding in recognition of their mutual interest in promoting and furthering academic links between the two institutions. The Office of Global Education and Strategic Programmes (GESP) at Ashoka University signed a MoU with National University of Singapore (NUS) in January 2022.

Ashoka University has also joined a consortium of five Indian Institutes of Technology (IIT Delhi, IIT Kanpur, IIT Bombay, IIT Jodhpur and IIT BHU, Varanasi) to sign a Memorandum of Understanding (MoU) with University at Buffalo, The State University of New York. The objective of this partnership is to establish a multiparty collaborative framework for long-term multi-institutional and international collaboration in educational and research fields. The research focus will be nanomaterials and nanotechnology, biotechnology, advanced sensors, photonics and cyber-physical systems including artificial intelligence. Ashoka University has further entered into a MoU with Max Healthcare Institute to initiate long-term, high-quality research collaborations. The collaboration aims to build a joint research program on genome analysis and data analysis that will include AI, ML and deep learning of various genetic and life-style diseases.

Notable Academics

Arts and Humanities

 Urvashi Butalia – feminist writer and publisher
 Amit Chaudhuri – novelist
 Navtej Johar – dancer, choreographer and yoga exponent
 Rita Kothari – author and translator
 Clancy Martin – philosopher
 Saikat Majumdar – novelist
 Janice Pariat – poet and writer
 Sumana Roy – poet and writer

Social science

 Pulapre Balakrishnan – economist
 Amita Baviskar – environmental sociologist
 Nayan Chanda – political scientist
 Ashwini Deshpande – economist
 Gopalkrishna Gandhi – politician; historian
 Sunil Khilnani – political scientist
 Nayanjot Lahiri – historian
 Srinath Raghavan – historian
 Upinder Singh – historian
 Aparna Vaidik – historian

Science
 Anurag Agrawal – medical scientist, pulmonologist
 Rajendra Bhatia – mathematician
 Alok Bhattacharya – parasitologist
 Sudha Bhattacharya – parasitologist
 Sourav Pal – theoretical chemist
 L. S. Shashidhara – developmental biologist, geneticist

Controversies
In October 2016, a faculty member, Rajendran Narayanan, and two other employees resigned; it was alleged by the Faculty Council that they were asked to resign because they signed a petition on Kashmir, something the university denies. Narayanan believes he was targeted because he was also organising a Workers' Welfare Committee for all campus staff.

In March 2021, two faculty members, Pratap Bhanu Mehta (formerly the VC of the university) and Arvind Subramanian, resigned within days of each other, alleging a curbing of academic freedom in the university. Mehta has been an open advocate of liberalism, speaking openly about the 'Death of liberalism' under the Narendra Modi Government. He resigned from Ashoka University in March 2021, when trustees Pramath Raj Sinha and Ashish Dhawan are said to have told him that his "intellectual interventions were something they could no longer protect." This was followed by protests from students and faculty, who alleged that Mehta's views on the Modi administration might have drawn pressure internally, leading him to resign. But the Vice Chancellor denied that

See also 
 List of universities in India
 List of institutions of higher education in Haryana
 List of private universities in India

References

External links 

Official website

Ashoka University
Sonipat district
Universities in Haryana
Private universities in India
Educational institutions established in 2014
2014 establishments in Haryana